Georgi Dimitrov Popov (born 14 July 1944) is a Bulgarian former football forward who played for Bulgaria in the 1970 FIFA World Cup. At club level, he spent 14 years of his career as a player at Botev Plovdiv.

Career
Born in Plovdiv, Popov began his career with local club Maritsa Plovdiv. In 1961, as a schoolboy, he joined Botev Plovdiv. With Botev, he won one A PFG title, one Bulgarian Cup and one Balkans Cup. Popov earned 308 appearances in the league, scoring 83 goals. In the Bulgarian Cup, he played 50 matches and scored 15 goals.

Honours

Club 
Botev Plovdiv
 A Group (1): 1966–67
 Bulgarian Cup (1): 1961–62
 Balkans Cup (1): 1972

References

External links
FIFA profile

1944 births
Living people
Footballers from Plovdiv
Bulgarian footballers
Bulgaria international footballers
Association football forwards
Botev Plovdiv players
First Professional Football League (Bulgaria) players
1970 FIFA World Cup players